Emilmuelleria is a genus of fungi within the Chaetomiaceae family. This is a monotypic genus, containing the single species Emilmuelleria spirotricha.

References

External links
Emilmuelleria at Index Fungorum

Sordariales
Monotypic Sordariomycetes genera